"Wishful Thinking" is a song written and performed by Duncan Sheik  for the soundtrack to the 1998 motion picture Great Expectations starring Ethan Hawke, Gwyneth Paltrow, and Robert De Niro. The song was released as the only radio single from the soundtrack.

Track listing

US radio promo
"Wishful Thinking" (Radio Edit) - 3:40
"Wishful Thinking" (Album Version) - 4:28

US Commercial Single
"Wishful Thinking" (Radio Edit) - 3:40
"In The Absence Of Sun" (Album Version) - 5:05

German commercial single
"Wishful Thinking" (Radio Edit) - 3:40
"In The Absence Of Sun" - 5:05
"Wishful Thinking" (Album Version) - 4:28

Duncan Sheik songs
1998 singles
Songs written by Duncan Sheik
1998 songs
Atlantic Records singles